The de Havilland DH.34 was a single engined British biplane airliner built by the de Havilland Aircraft Company in the 1920s. 12 were built, with the DH.34 serving with Imperial Airways and its predecessors for several years.

Design and development
By 1921, enough experience had been gained with operation of the de Havilland DH.18 to realise that aircraft needed to be more efficient to improve the economics of air travel. de Havilland therefore built the ten-passenger DH.29 monoplane, while starting work on the design of the DH.32, a biplane of similar size and capacity to the eight-passenger DH.18, but with a less powerful but more economical Rolls-Royce Eagle engine. Owing to the urgent need for more capacity, however, work on the DH.29 and DH.32 was stopped and the DH.34 biplane was designed, with a similar fuselage to the DH.29, accommodating ten passengers.

The DH.34 had a wooden, plywood-clad fuselage, with the cockpit (for two pilots) being positioned ahead of the wings and the passenger cabin. It had two-bay wooden wings and was powered by a Napier Lion engine, which was fitted for inertia starting, avoiding the necessity for hand swinging of the propeller to start the engine. Unusually, the design of  the aircraft allowed an entire spare engine to be carried on board across the rear of the passenger cabin. The cabin door's unusual shape was to allow the engine to be loaded and unloaded, and a specially-fitted 'porthole' on the other side of the cabin would be removed to allow the propeller boss to protrude out the side of the aircraft. Spare engines were not carried routinely (the DH.34's payload was too low to carry both passengers and a spare engine) but this facility was used by operators to quickly fly spare engines out to aircraft that had suffered breakdown.

Two DH.34s were ordered by the Daimler Airway, as part of an initial batch of nine aircraft, with the first prototype (registered G-EBBQ) flying on 26 March 1922.

Operational history
The DH.34 entered service with Daimler on 2 April 1922 on the Croydon-Paris service. Daimler operated a total of six D.H.34s, four of which were leased from the Air Council, with Instone Air Line operating a further four, all leased. One aircraft was built to the order of the Soviet airline Dobrolyot.

When Imperial Airways was formed on 1 April 1924, by the merger of Daimler Airway, Instone Air Line, Handley Page Transport and the British Marine Air Navigation Company, it inherited six D.H.34s, retaining the type in service until March 1926.

The DH.34s were used heavily on the cross channel air services, with the fleet flying 8,000 hours in the first nine months of operation, and the second aircraft flying over  without overhaul. Six D.H.34s were lost in accidents during the four years of their operation, of which several were fatal.

In November 1923 an excellent air safety record for the "English Air Service" was broken by "a disaster in the London-Birmingham air route" when a DH.34 carrying only 3 passengers crashed near the Ivenhoe Beacon near Leighton Buzzard where it was seen to be in difficulties before suddenly nose-diving at high speed into the ground killing all on board.

Variants
DH.34 Initial production version. 11 completed.
DH.34B Modication of DH.34 with extended upper wing to improve stalling characteristics.

Operators

 Dobrolyot

 Daimler Airway
 Imperial Airways
 Instone Air Line

Accidents and incidents
 On 13 August 1923, G-EBBW of Instone Air Line landed at Marden Airfield due to a broken oil pipe. The aircraft was repaired and returned to Croydon.
 On 30 August 1923, G-EBBQ, the first registered DH.34, of Daimler Hire on a flight to Antwerp, crashed at Croydon Airport and was written off. There were no casualties.
 On 14 September 1923, G-EBBS of Daimler Airway crashed at Ivinghoe Beacon, Buckinghamshire whilst on a flight from Croydon to Manchester, Lancashire.
 On 24 December 1924, G-EBBX of Imperial Airways crashed and caught fire shortly after take-off from Croydon, killing the pilot and all seven passengers.

Specifications (DH.34)

See also

References

Citations

Bibliography
Donald, David, ed. The Encyclopedia of World Aircraft. London: Aerospace Publishing, 1997. .
Jackson, A.J. British Civil Aircraft since 1919 Volume 2. London: Putnam,1973. .
 "The D.H. Type 34 Commercial Biplane" Flight, 5 January 1922, 3-View Drawing
 "The D.H. Type 34 Commercial Biplane" Flight, 30 March 1922, further technical details

Single-engined tractor aircraft
Biplanes
1920s British airliners
DH.034
Aircraft first flown in 1922